Bar Ahang (also Romanized as Bar Āhang and Barāheng; also known as Derakht-e Lashkarī) is a village in Jakdan Rural District, in the Central District of Bashagard County, Hormozgan Province, Iran. At the 2006 census, its population was 228, in 50 families.

References 

Populated places in Bashagard County